Jack Rowland Hallam (born 10 September 1942), a former Australian politician, was a member of the New South Wales Legislative Council from 1973 to 1991 representing the ALP. Hallam held several ministerial posts in the state governments led by Neville Wran and Barrie Unsworth.

Early years
Born in Griffith, New South Wales, Hallam worked as an apprentice plumber in 1956, a roustabout and wool classer from 1956 to 1959, a contract harvester and share farmer from 1959 to 1964, and a sheep farmer from 1967 to 1976. At various times he held membership of the Australian Workers' Union and the Federated Clerks' Union.

Political career
In 1973 Hallam was appointed to the New South Wales Legislative Council to represent the Australian Labor Party. Five years later, Neville Wran having by this stage become Premier, Hallam was appointed Minister for Decentralisation, moving to Agriculture in 1980. He remained Agriculture Minister until 1988; he was also minister for Fisheries (1981–86), Lands (1986–88), Forests (1986–88) and Vice-President of the Executive Council (1986–88). He was also Deputy Leader of the Government in the Legislative Council (1978–86), and Leader (1986–88).

In 1984, as the NSW Minister for Agriculture and Forestry, Hallam instigated a commemorative award, called the McKell Medal, in honour of the contribution that Sir William McKell had made to the development of a soil and water conservation ethic within Australia.

Hallam continued to lead the Opposition in the Legislative Council until he retired from politics in 1991.

Published writings

References

1942 births
Living people
Members of the New South Wales Legislative Council
People from Griffith, New South Wales
Australian Labor Party members of the Parliament of New South Wales